James B. Hill (born November 29, 1856, near Fremont, Sandusky County, Ohio, died in 1945 in Raceland, Louisiana) was an American inventor.

Hill worked as a drainage tiler in northwestern Ohio in the 1870s and 1880s, during which time he devised a machine that he later named the Buckeye Traction Ditcher (U.S. Patent 523-790; July 31, 1894).  The Buckeye allowed for the quick placement of drainage tiles to aid in cultivation.  After ridding northwest Ohio of its Great Black Swamp, Hill’s invention, produced by the Buckeye Traction Ditcher Company of Findlay, Ohio, went on to drain large parts of Florida and Louisiana.

Finding his early machines bogged down by the mud of Louisiana, Hill designed wheels that could travel over soft, wet earth.  He termed this style of wheel "apron traction", and it became the forerunner for modern tank wheels (U.S. Patent 866-647; September 24, 1907  ).

Hill spent his last years breeding new varieties of corn which could flourish in Louisiana, most notably "Hill’s White Cob Yellow Dent".  While visiting business associates in Florida at the turn of the 20th century, Hill designed an early amphibious vehicle.

The American Society of Mechanical Engineers designated an original Buckeye Steam Traction Ditcher as an "International Historic Mechanical Engineering Landmark" in 1988.  This organization also maintains Hill's gravestone at Maple Grove Cemetery in Findlay, on which a ditcher is engraved. An antique ditcher can be seen today at the Hancock County Historical Museum in Findlay.

Family
Hill and his first wife Ella MacDonald had 10 children. Near his death, he boasted of having more than 100 descendants. These descendants are scattered throughout the United States, with the majority living in southern Louisiana (centering on Raceland) and northwest Ohio (centering on Toledo).

He also married Elizabeth Christian  (her 3rd marriage) in Raceland, Louisiana. His son, Cloyse Adrian (aka Butch), married Elizabeth's daughter, Ada Jurgens. They had 2 children: Wayne and Arta Hill.

References

External links
  James B. Hill Biography and Genealogy
 H e a r t l a n d S c i e n c e - - The Ohio Academy of Science - at www.heartlandscience.org
 #133 Buckeye Steam Traction Ditcher (1902) - Landmarks at www.asme.org
  American Society of Mechanical Engineers
  Steam Traction

1856 births
1945 deaths
People from Sandusky County, Ohio
American inventors
People from Raceland, Louisiana